Phật Tích Temple (Chữ Hán: 佛跡寺, literally the Temple of Buddhist Relics) is a Buddhist temple located in the south of Phat Tich mountain, Tiên Du District, Bac Ninh Province, Vietnam.
This is an important listed cultural site of Vietnam.

Buddhist temples in Vietnam
Buildings and structures in Bắc Ninh province